Saburo Aoki (born 1956) is a Japanese linguist and member of the faculty of Humanities and Social Sciences at the University of Tsukuba. He specializes in French language and literature, semantics, and linguistics. His research is mainly on cross-cultural communication and  comparative studies of Japanese and French. He is the deputy of the Institute for Comparative Research in Human and Social Sciences (ICR).

Research keywords

Cross-linguistic research on French and Japanese language
Francophony study
Dialogue between civilisations
Global negotiation
Research for development in Japanese language
Culture and society

Research projects

(current) Contrastive Linguistics in French language and Japanese language
2012-2014 Center of Research for Development in Japanese Culture and Society
2011-2013 The Emerging Role of the Humanities in Our Present Changing Society

Career history

2014- (current) Faculty of Humanities and Social Sciences, Internationalization Promotion Office University of Tsukuba, Director　　　
2013- (current) Institute for Comparative Research in Human and Social Sciences (ICR),　Deputy　　
2013-2014 University of Tsukuba Global Commons,　Director
2011- (current) University of Tsukuba Faculty of Humanities ＆ Social Sciences, Professor
2011- (current) Europe-East Asia Education Program for Global Development in the Humanities and Social Sciences (TRANS), Management Committee
2008-2015 Alliance for Research on North Africa (ARENA), Management Committee
2005-2011 University of Tsukuba Graduate School of Humanities & Social Sciences, Professor
2007- (current) Inter Faculty Education & Research Initiative (IFERI) Head of Management Committee
2004-2005 University of Tsukuba Graduate School of Humanities & Social Sciences, assistant professor
1993-2004 University of Tsukuba Institute of Literature & Linguistics, assistant professor
1986-1993 University of Tsukuba Institute of Literature & Linguistics, lecturer

Academic background
1979-1980 Universite Paris 7 Departement de Linguistique (Linguistics), Completed
1977-1979 Universite de Besançon Faculty of Literature, Graduated

Degree
1984-12 Docteur en linguistique University of Paris 7

Academic societies
2012 - (current) The Japanese Society for Global System and Ethics
1986 - (current) La Société Japonaise de Langue et Littérature Françaises
1986 - (current) Japanese Society Of French Linguistics
 (current) Japanese Cognitive Linguistics Association

Major publications in English and French

L'interprétation croisée d'une pratique de karaté: le conflit des fondations France/Japon, Saburo Aoki,　2013
Cross-linguistic study of grammar - the Japanese and the French, Saburo Aoki, 1989
La personne en japonais Junji Kawaguchi; France Dhorne; Saburo Aoki, 1995
« Triste » d’une langue à l’autre Saburo Aoki, 2005
Les études françaises au Japon Francine Thyrion; Jean René Klein; Saburo Aoki, 2010

References 

1956 births
Living people
Linguists from Japan
People from Tokyo
University of Paris alumni
Academic staff of the University of Tsukuba
Japanese expatriates in France